The Paikiasothy Saravanamuttu Stadium is a cricket stadium in Colombo, Sri Lanka. It hosted Sri Lanka's first test match in 1982.  The venue is the home ground of the Tamil Union Cricket and Athletic Club.

Key
 * denotes that the batsman was not out.
 Inns. denotes the number of the innings in the match.
 Balls denotes the number of balls faced in an innings.
 NR denotes that the number of balls was not recorded.
 Parentheses next to the player's name denotes his century number at the P Sara Stadium.
 The column title Date refers to the date the match started.
 The column title Result refers to whether the player's team won lost or if the match was drawn or a no result.

List of centuries

Test centuries

The following table summarises the Test centuries scored at the P. Sara Stadium.

One Day International centuries

The following table summarises the One Day International centuries scored at the P Sara Stadium.

External links
Cricinfo P Sara Stadium profile

References 

Paikiasothy
Cricket grounds in Sri Lanka
Centuries
Centuries